Article 15 or article quinze is a humorous French idiom in the Democratic Republic of the Congo which is used to justify an action taken on an individual's initiative. Originating during the Congo Crisis and popularised under the Zairean regime, it references a fictional provision of the 14-article constitution of the secessionist state of South Kasai which was said to read, in French,  (literally, "get on with it", "figure it out yourself", "deal with it yourself", or "do what you need to do"). 

A popular idiom, the phrase is used to mean that individuals cannot expect help from the state and must use their own initiative to muddle through. It is sometimes used to justify unlawful conduct. Since the fall of Mobutu, the article is invoked to justify or explain corruption and petty theft in the country.

Article 15 plays a prominent role in Congolese popular culture, such as the Congolese rumba song "Article 15, oyebi yango" (1963) or "Article 15 Beta Libanga" (1985).

See also
 System D, an equivalent concept in English from European French.
 Politics of the belly.

References

Further reading

External links

Crime in the Democratic Republic of the Congo
Corruption in Africa
French language in Africa
1960s neologisms
French slang
Informal economy in Africa
Fictional laws